The National Premier Leagues Victoria 2, commonly referred to as NPL Victoria 2, is a semi-professional soccer league in Victoria, Australia. The league is the second-highest in the Victorian league system, behind the National Premier Leagues Victoria, and forms the third tier of the overall Australian league system.

Originally founded as NPL 1 in 2014, it has undergone several changes in competition structure since its inception. Comprising 14 teams in its first season, the league then featured 20 teams divided into two geographic East and West conferences from 2015–19. With the creation of NPL Victoria 3 in 2020, a state-wide second division was re-founded, comprising 12 clubs.

The competition is administered by Football Victoria, the governing body of the sport in the state.

Format
In 2014, the competition was a 14 team league.

For the 2015–2019 seasons, the league was divided into East and West conferences of 10 teams each. Each team played home and away against teams in their conference and single games against each team in the opposite conference. The winner of each conference was promoted to the NPL Victoria, while second place in each conference entered into a promotion/relegation series.

In 2020, the competition reverted to a 12 team league.

For 2023 seasons, the competition returns to a 14 team league.

Current clubs (2023)
The following clubs will take part in the 2023 NPL Victoria 2 season:

History
Avondale FC were the inaugural champions of the National Premier Leagues Victoria 1 division in 2014, while North Geelong finished the season as runners up with both sides earning promotion to the National Premier Leagues Victoria.

On 6 November 2014, Football Federation Victoria announced Melbourne City FC NPL and Melbourne Victory FC Youth would join the league in 2015. Eastern Lions SC, Murray United FC, Nunawading City FC and Moreland City FC all also joined the expanded competition for the 2015 season. FC Bulleen Lions and Richmond SC were the two clubs to achieve automatic promotion in the revamped league in 2015 by winning their respective conferences. Melbourne Victory joined them by beating NPL2 West runner up Moreland Zebras FC in the NPL2 preliminary promotion playoff, and then North Geelong in the promotion playoff, with North Geelong joining automatically relegated sides Werribee City FC and Dandenong Thunder SC in NPL2 for 2016.

In 2016, St Albans Saints SC and Kingston City FC won automatic promotion by winning their respective West and East conferences, while North Geelong immediately bounced back into the top-flight, beating Dandenong Thunder in the NPL2 playoff and Richmond in the NPL promotion-relegation playoff. Richmond, Melbourne Victory and Northcote City FC were the relegated sides from NPL, joining the NPL2 for 2017.

Past winners

References

External links
 Football Victoria website

Notes

Soccer leagues in Victoria (Australia)
Recurring sporting events established in 2014
2014 establishments in Australia
Sports leagues established in 2014
Professional sports leagues in Australia
Third level football leagues in Asia